Harry Robert "Bob" Purkey (July 13, 1934 – February 16, 2018) was an American politician. Starting in 1986, he was a Republican member of the Virginia House of Delegates, representing the 82nd district in Virginia Beach.

Purkey announced that he would not run for reelection in 2013.

Notes

External links

1934 births
2018 deaths
Republican Party members of the Virginia House of Delegates
Old Dominion University alumni
Politicians from Virginia Beach, Virginia
People from Parsons, West Virginia
Military personnel from West Virginia
Businesspeople from Virginia
Stockbrokers
21st-century American politicians
20th-century American businesspeople